Monisha Unni (24 January 1970 – 5 December 1992) was an Indian actress, known for her works in Malayalam, Tamil cinema.

Monisha was 16 when she became the youngest actress ever to receive the National Film Award for Best Actress for Nakhakshathangal (1986), her debut feature film. Along with Sharada, Shobhana, Meera Jasmine, Surabhi Lakshmi and Shobha, Monisha Unni is one of six Malayalam actresses who have won the National Film Award for Best Actress.

In her short career, Monisha collaborated with directors such as M. T. Vasudevan Nair, Hariharan, Priyadarshan, Ajayan, Kamal and Sibi Malayil.

Early life 

Monisha Unni was born in Panniyankara, Kozhikode in 1971 to Narayanan Unni and Sreedevi Unni. She completed her schooling at St. Charles High School, Bangalore and Bishop Cotton Girls School, Bangalore. She completed her graduation in psychology at Mount Carmel College, Bangalore. She had an elder brother, Sajith Unni.

Death 
Monisha Unni was working on the Malayalam film Cheppadividya when she died in a car accident. On 5 December 1992, a car carrying Monisha and her mother Sreedevi Unni met with an accident near Cherthala in Alappuzha. While her mother escaped with fractures and bruises, Monisha succumbed to her injuries.

Career 
Malayalam novelist M. T. Vasudevan Nair, who is also a screenwriter and film director, was a family friend of Monisha.  M. T. was responsible for Monisha's entry into films. She made her debut in Nakhakshathangal (1986), which was written by M. T. and directed by Hariharan. The film portrayed a love triangle involving three teenagers. Monisha's portrayal of Gowri, the film's female protagonist, won her the National Film Award for Best Actress in 1987.

Filmography

References

External links 
 Monisha at MSI
 

Indian film actresses
People from Kozhikode district
Actresses in Malayalam cinema
1971 births
1992 deaths
Actresses from Kerala
Best Actress National Film Award winners
Road incident deaths in India
20th-century Indian actresses
Actresses in Tamil cinema
Actresses in Telugu cinema
Mount Carmel College, Bangalore alumni